Villa Riva is a municipality (municipio) of the Duarte Province in the Dominican Republic.

History
The community of El Cercado was founded in 1845 by President Pedro Santana. It previously belonged to the municipality of Bánica and was called the Sabana del Bohío, and was elevated to town by a war veteran, Francisco Rodriguez. The first families to settle in this area were Florencio Montero, Telésforo de Oleo, Encarnación, Manuelica y Fidel Matos and Leonardo Brito. El Cercado people have the reputation for being very hospitable, friendly and kind. 

The main economic source is agriculture consisting of cattle, snuff, honey, wax, leather and coffee. The main form of communication was the horse, which started the mail service.

Climate

Villa Riva has a tropical rainforest climate (Köppen climate classification: Af).

References 

Populated places in Duarte Province
Municipalities of the Dominican Republic